Nico Collins (born March 19, 1999) is an American football wide receiver for the Houston Texans of the National Football League (NFL). He played college football at Michigan.

Early years
Collins was a wide receiver at Clay-Chalkville High School in Pinson, Alabama. As a junior, he caught 60 passes for 1,103 yards for 16 touchdowns. This was followed by a senior year with 43 passes for 865 yards and 9 touchdowns. In February 2017 Collins committed to play football at Michigan over Georgia and Alabama.

College career
On October 12, 2017, Collins made his first collegiate reception on a 12 yard pass against Rutgers University. As a freshman, he appeared in 2 games and had three receptions for 27 yards. He had a breakout season in his sophomore year in 2018. He had a 51-yard catch against Maryland, a 47-yard catch against Penn State and four catches for a career-high 91 yards and two touchdowns against Ohio State. He ended the season as the most improved offensive player of the team with 38 receptions for 632 yards and 6 touchdowns. On November 23, 2019, Collins had a career-best 146 receiving yards and 3 touchdowns against Indiana. Despite playing along Donovan Peoples-Jones, Tarik Black and Ronnie Bell, Collins was second on the team in receiving yards in 2019, with 729 yards from 37 receptions and had 7 touchdowns.

Statistics

Professional career

Collins was drafted 89th overall by the Houston Texans in the third round of the 2021 NFL Draft. On May 12, 2021, Collins officially signed with the Texans.

2021 season: rookie year
Heading into his first training camp in the NFL, Collins was listed as a starting wide receiver alongside veterans Brandin Cooks and Chris Conley. At the end of the NFL preseason, head coach David Culley named Collins a starting wide receiver, alongside Cooks and Conley, to begin the season.  

Collins made his first career start and NFL debut in the Texans' Week 1 victory against the Jacksonville Jaguars.  He recorded 1 reception for 7 yards while playing in 55% of the team's offensive snaps.  Collins also started in the Texans' Week 2 loss to the Cleveland Browns, where he recorded 1 reception for 32 yards before exiting early in the first quarter with a shoulder injury.  Collins was placed on injured reserve on September 21, 2021. He was activated on October 16, 2021 and returned to start the Texans' Week 6 loss to the Indianapolis Colts.  Collins recorded 4 receptions for 44 yards in that game while playing in 57% of the offensive snaps.  In Week 8 against the Los Angeles Rams, Collins caught all four of his targets for 55 yards as the Texans lost the game 22-38.  In Week 14 against the Seattle Seahawks, Collins recorded 5 receptions for 69 yards and caught his first career touchdown pass while playing 70% of the offensive snaps.  In the Texans' Week 18 season finale against the Tennessee Titans, Collins recorded 3 receptions for 67 yards while playing 72% of the offensive snaps.  

Overall, Collins finished his rookie season appearing in 14 games (8 starts) and recorded 33 receptions for 446 yards and one touchdown while playing in 59% of the Texans' offensive snaps on the season.

2022 season
Collins entered the 2022 season as the Texans No. 2 receiver behind Brandin Cooks. He finished the season with 37 catches for 481 yards and two touchdowns through 10 games and seven starts.

NFL career statistics

References

External links
 Michigan Wolverines bio

1999 births
Living people
American football wide receivers
Houston Texans players
Michigan Wolverines football players
Players of American football from Birmingham, Alabama